The Wuzhi Mountain Military Cemetery (sometimes romanized as Wuchih) is Taiwan's most prominent military cemetery. The cemetery has a wide open view ranging from the Taipei 101 over at Taipei's Xinyi District to the Keelung Harbor.

History

General Chiang Wei-kuo, the adopted son of Chiang Kai-shek, conceived and designed the cemetery. Prior to the construction of the cemetery, the land was used as a golf course. Planning for the cemetery started in April 1980, with construction starting on March 20, 1981; the cemetery opened on March 29, 1982.

A four-story columbarium named the Memorial Palace was opened on January 20, 2002 after two years of construction. It has a total capacity of 19,537 niches on the four named floors:

Issues

Capacity
Although the cemetery has nearly 226 hectares total area, the terrain and building codes restrict interment to only 78 ha of the land. , the cemetery, which has 9,236 grave plots, is nearly full; further deceased military officials will need to be cremated and their ashes stored in the columbarium.

Chiang family
In 2004, Chiang Fang-liang made a request to inter the bodies of Chiang Kai-shek and his son, Chiang Ching-kuo at Wuzhi. However, the plan did not receive universal support from the Chiang family, and despite the completion of their tombs at Wuzhi, Chiang Kai-shek and his son remain at Cihu and Touliao, respectively.

Notable interments
Most are senior generals who served under KMT from mainland China or dignitaries
 Chiang Wei-kuo, general and adopted son of Chiang Kai-shek
 Huang Baitao
 Gu Zhutong, a senior general who followed Chiang from Shanghai
 He Yingqin, a senior KMT general who was chief staff and chief instructor from Whampoa Military Academy.
 Huang Chieh, general and former Taiwan Governor who brought servicemen from western Hunan Province.
 Liu Yuzhang, general from Tsingtao 
 Tang Enbo
 Sun Zhen
 Sun Lianzhong
 Cheng Wei-yuan
 Yen Chia-kan, former President of the Republic of China
 Xue Yue, General from Kwangtung
 Wang Shuming
 Ding Delong, General from Hunan
 Wang Sheng
 Louie Yim-qun
 Chuang Ming-yao
 Nelson Ku
 Chiang Chung-ling
 Chen Hsing-ling
 Hau Pei-tsun, former Premier of the Republic of China
 Lee Teng-hui, former President of the Republic of China
 Tang Yao-ming

See also
 Cihu Mausoleum
 Touliao Mausoleum
 Arlington National Cemetery
 Babaoshan Revolutionary Cemetery
 Revolutionary Martyrs' Cemetery
 Patriotic Martyrs' Cemetery
 Seoul National Cemetery

References

Cemeteries in Taiwan
Military cemeteries
Geography of New Taipei
Tourist attractions in New Taipei
Military of the Republic of China
1982 establishments in Taiwan
National cemeteries